Kingcome Inlet is a locality on the Central Coast region of British Columbia, located on the inlet of the same name.

See also
List of Kwakwaka'wakw villages

References

Settlements in British Columbia
Central Coast of British Columbia
Kwakwaka'wakw villages